Warwick Dashwood Hirtzel Dalton (born 19 February 1937) is a former racing cyclist from New Zealand.

At the 1958 British Empire and Commonwealth Games he won the bronze medal in both the men's 1 km time trial and individual pursuit.

He competed at two Olympics, in Melbourne in 1956 and Rome in 1960, with his best result of 7th place in the 1 km time trial at Melbourne.

He won the Australian national road race title in 1963.

References

External links

1937 births
Living people
Commonwealth Games bronze medallists for New Zealand
Commonwealth Games medallists in cycling
Cyclists at the 1956 Summer Olympics
Cyclists at the 1958 British Empire and Commonwealth Games
Cyclists at the 1960 Summer Olympics
New Zealand male cyclists
Olympic cyclists of New Zealand
Sportspeople from the Auckland Region
Medallists at the 1958 British Empire and Commonwealth Games